Mulder and Scully may refer to:

 Fox Mulder and Dana Scully, the main characters of the television series The X-Files
 Mulder and Scully (song), a 1998 Catatonia single based on the aforementioned characters